Marco Spanehl (born 3 December 1967) is a German weightlifter. He competed in the men's featherweight event at the 1992 Summer Olympics.

References

1967 births
Living people
German male weightlifters
Olympic weightlifters of Germany
Weightlifters at the 1992 Summer Olympics
Sportspeople from Schwerin